Ursula Moser Cowgill (9 November 1927 – November 27, 2015) was a biologist and anthropologist who worked for Yale University, Dow Chemical Company and the University of Colorado during the second half of the 20th century. Her work includes studies of agricultural practices in pre-Columbian Mesoamerica, seasons of birth in human beings, the relationship between cultural gender bias and infant mortality, and the possible role of selenium in reducing mortality from AIDS. She also looked after four pottos for many years and published a series of observations on their behaviour.

Cowgill earned a PhD from Iowa State University in 1956. Later she worked as an analytical chemist for the limnologist G. Evelyn Hutchinson. Her first journal articles, some published jointly with Hutchinson, appeared in the early 1960s.

Cowgill was living in Colorado as of 2003. In addition to her scientific research, she was an activist with the American Civil Liberties Union.

Work and findings

Pottos
In 1959, three pairs of pottos from West Africa arrived at Yale's Osborn Zoological Laboratory. At first they lived in the laboratory with a number of other nocturnal prosimians that Cowgill and Hutchinson were studying. In 1964, Cowgill took two of the pairs to live with her. She looked after them until 1981, when she gave the sole surviving male to a colleague.

While the pottos were with her, Cowgill published a number of journal articles on their anatomy, diet, reproduction, illnesses and recovery, and social behaviour. These publications constitute one of the few long-term studies of pottos in captivity.

Maya agriculture
Between 1961 and 1963, Cowgill and Hutchinson made studies of soil in the Petén Basin, Guatemala, with the aim of learning about the effects of agricultural practices of the pre-Columbian Maya civilization. Their findings reported that Maya cultivation methods had gradually robbed the soil of vital elements, meaning that it eventually became unable to sustain crops. Some scholars have linked this exhaustion of the soil to the 10th-century decline of the Maya urban settlements in the Petén region.

Sex ratio and childhood mortality
Cowgill's research into gender and child mortality covered both historical records in England and contemporary observations in Guatemala. Using birth and death records from the parish registers of York between 1538 and 1812, Cowgill found that throughout the city's history, girls at every stage of childhood had died at a higher rate than boys of the same age. This resulted in an adult sex ratio of 136 males for every 100 females. Cowgill theorised that this was partly because girls were more likely to be victims of infanticide, and partly because sons tended to receive better feeding and care than daughters.

In Guatemala, Cowgill studied an indigenous village where the sex ratio was even more skewed—178:100. Cowgill observed that mothers in this village breastfed sons for much longer than daughters, and tended to give them preferential treatment even after weaning. Cowgill and Hutchinson also speculated that the sexually provocative behaviour of young girls in this village might be a survival mechanism.

Seasons of birth
Cowgill undertook one of the first scientific studies of seasonality in human reproduction. Taking data from historical records and indigenous peoples in various countries, she concluded that conception and birth in human beings, like that of many other animals, followed seasonal patterns to a degree. Because the pattern was different in the Northern and Southern Hemispheres, Cowgill hypothesised that weather was the determining factor. However, she found that in urbanised and industrialised areas the pattern had been disrupted. Her 1966 article on the topic, published in the journal Ecology, has formed the basis for subsequent research by other scientists.

Selenium and AIDS
In 1997, Cowgill gauged the selenium content of soil in various locations in the United States by measuring the amount of the mineral that was absorbed by alfalfa. She then correlated this information with the mortality rate of AIDS in the area. She found that the more selenium there was in the soil, the lower mortality from AIDS was. The relationship was especially strong among African-Americans.

Publications

 Bajo de Santa Fe (with G.E. Hutchinson). Book, 1963.

 The history of Laguna de Petenxil, a small lake in Northern Guatemala. Book, 1966.

 Aquatic toxicology and hazard assessment, 12th volume (with Llewellyn R. Williams). Book, 1989.

References

External links
 

1927 births
2015 deaths
American biologists
American anthropologists
American women anthropologists
American Mesoamericanists
Women Mesoamericanists
Mesoamerican anthropologists
American women biologists
Women primatologists
Primatologists
20th-century Mesoamericanists
Iowa State University alumni
American Civil Liberties Union people
20th-century American women scientists
20th-century American scientists
21st-century American women